HMS Encounter was a  built for the Royal Navy in the early 1870s.

Notes

Footnotes

Bibliography

 

 

1873 ships
Ships built in Sheerness
Amethyst-class corvettes
Victorian-era corvettes of the United Kingdom